Bárbara Jacobs (born 19 October 1947) is a Mexican writer, poet, essayist and translator.

Life
Born in Mexico City in 1947, Jacobs grew up in a home where five languages were spoken. Her grandparents were Lebanese Jewish and Lebanese Maronites. After attending school in Montreal, Quebec, Canada, she returned to Mexico and received a degree in psychology from the National Autonomous University of Mexico.

From 1974 to 1977, Jacobs taught and conducted research at the College of Mexico. Beginning in 1970, Jacobs has published stories and essays in literary magazines and supplements. Her novel, Las hojas muertas  (Dead leaves; 1987), received the Xavier Villaurrutia Award, and has been translated into English, Italian and Portuguese. It was also a selection of the Secretariat of Public Education. Some of Jacobs' works have been published in collective anthologies in Castilian, English, French, Italian and German. Her books have been published in Mexico, US, Spain, Portugal, Argentina and Italy.

Jacobs was married to the writer Augusto Monterroso (died, 2003), who was the Prince of Asturias Award for Literature laureate in 2000. She donated his work to the University of Oviedo.

Honors
1987, Xavier Villaurrutia Award
1992–93, Scholarship, National Foundation for Culture and Arts (Mexico)
1993, AT&T Fellow, International Writing Program, University of Iowa

Selected works
Stories
Un justo acuerdo, La Máquina de Escribir, 1979
Doce cuentos en contra, Martín Casillas, 1982, 

Novels
Las hojas muertas, Era, 1987; <
The Dead Leaves, Curbstone Press, 1993, 
Las siete fugas de Saab, alias el Rizos, Alfaguara / CONCAULTA, Botella al Mar, 1992, 
Vida con mi amigo, Alfaguara, Madrid, 1994, 
Adiós humanidad, Alfaguara, 2000. 
Florencia y ruiseñor, Alfaguara 2006. 

Essays
Escrito en el tiempo, Era, 1985, 
Juego limpio (ensayos y apostillas), Alfaguara, 1997, 
Dos libros, Alfaguara, 2000, 
Atormentados, Alfaguara, 2002

Anthology

References

Bibliography

1947 births
Living people
Mexican women novelists
Mexican women poets
Mexican essayists
Mexican translators
20th-century Mexican writers
Writers from Mexico City
National Autonomous University of Mexico alumni
Academic staff of El Colegio de México
Mexican Maronites
Mexican Sephardi Jews
Mexican people of Lebanese descent
Mexican people of Lebanese-Jewish descent
20th-century Mexican women writers
20th-century translators
20th-century essayists